The Coquimbo marked gecko (Garthia penai) is a species of lizard in the family Phyllodactylidae. The species is endemic to Chile. Is the smallest reptile of this country.

Etymology
The specific name, penai, is in honor of Chilean entomologist Luis Enrique Peña Guzmán (1921–1995).

Reproduction
G. penai is oviparous.

References

Further reading
Donoso-Barros R (1966). Reptiles de Chile. Santiago, Chile: Ediciones de la Universidad de Chile. 458 + cxlvi pp., 32 color plates, 175 black-and-white plates, text figures, maps. (Garthia penai, new species, p. 125). (in Spanish).

Garthia
Reptiles of Chile
Reptiles described in 1966
Endemic fauna of Chile